Mehrano Wildlife Sanctuary is situated in Khairpur District of Pakistan province of Sindh an enhanced riverine forest privately preserved by the Talpur Mir royal family of Khairpur Princely state with endorsement by the Sindh wildlife department.  It comprises agricultural land, forest, and hunting area and is home to various flora and fauna.
Mehrano Forest is home to approximately 4,000 big game animals, including blackbuck, Indian gazelle,  hog deer, wild boar. Additionally the forest lake boasts resident and migratory birds from Siberia and Europe. There is a reserved place for tourists to see wild boars. Mir Ali Murad Khan Talpur II, head of the royal house, has forbidden all hunting except of the jackal and an annual culling of wild boars which become a mortal threat to adjacent farmers and their families when boar populations become too large for the forest to hold.  The Mehrano reserve shares its boundary with the Cholistan desert.

References

External links
 Tourism in Sindh
 Mehrano Wildlife Reserve Khaipur
 Mehrano Reserve
 Mehrano Fishing Reserve
 A Ride to Kot Diji Fort, Mehrano and Faiz Mahal Khairpur at YouTube

Natural history of Sindh
Wildlife sanctuaries of Pakistan
Protected areas of Sindh